Mylove is a village in Beryslav Raion, within Kherson Oblast, Ukraine. It was established in 1781. Mylove hosts the administration of Mylove rural hromada, one of the hromadas of Ukraine.

Mylove was occupied by the Russian military in early March 2022 during its invasion of Ukraine and was regained by Ukrainian forces on 10 November 2022.

References

Populated places established in the Russian Empire
Villages in Beryslav Raion
Populated places on the Dnieper in Ukraine